The third season of Australian Survivor is a television series based on the international reality game show franchise Survivor. This season, announced by Ten in November 2015, is the third Australian edition of the program, the second to feature non-celebrity contestants and the first to air on Network Ten. The first season aired on the Nine Network in 2002, while the second season (a celebrity edition) aired in 2006 on the Seven Network. This season gives Australian Survivor the rare distinction of being one of the few Australian programs to have aired across all three commercial networks in Australia.

The season was filmed in Samoa from May to July 2016 and premiered on 21 August 2016 on Network Ten. Hosted by Jonathan LaPaglia, the program featured 24 Australian castaways competing for 55 days for a grand prize of A$500,000. After 55 days on the island, Kristie Bennett was named the "Sole Survivor" and awarded the grand prize over former professional cricketer Lee Carseldine by a jury vote of 8–1.

Production

Conception
After Australian Celebrity Survivor was not renewed by the Seven Network, a third season of Australian Survivor appeared unlikely. However, in August 2013, the creator of the Survivor format, Charlie Parsons revealed in an interview with fan website and podcast Survivor Oz that the rights to produce Australian Survivor had been licensed to an undisclosed production company. The company who believed that there was an appetite for the program and would be approaching Australian networks to commission the potential series. 

On 19 November 2015, Network Ten revealed at their upfronts that they would be commissioning a revival of Australian Survivor to air in mid-late 2016. They also announced that Endermol Shine Australia would be producing the series in association with Castaway Television.

Twists 
This season of Australian Survivor introduced several elements from international editions of Survivor, including: hidden immunity idols, small trinkets that, when played on a castaway after the votes were cast at Tribal Council but before they were read, negated all votes cast against them at that Tribal Council; the ability to prohibit another player from voting at a single Tribal Council, as offered during the season's Survivor Auction; and Exile Beach, where a small number of castaways were banished to a separate beach for a predetermined amount of time, and given minimal tools for survival.

Casting
With the announcement of the series in November 2015, a casting call was made for potential contestants. Applicants for the series were required to be 18 years of age or older, be Australian citizens or permanent residents and be able to swim. More than 5,000 people applied within the first week of casting being opened, and 7,500 had applied before the year's end. Submissions eventually reached 15,000 before the 10 February deadline, making it the largest pool of applicants for a Network Ten reality program.

Filming and development
The season was rumored to be filmed in Samoa as early as March, and was officially confirmed on 9 May by LaPaglia in a radio interview on the Hamish & Andy show. The season was filmed on the island of Upolu, the same location used in four seasons of the American edition of Survivor: Samoa, Heroes vs. Villains, South Pacific and One World. In total, 250 Australians and at least 180 Samoan locals worked on the program, including Trent Pattison, who has previously worked as a challenge producer on the American edition as well as Ten's own I'm a Celebrity...Get Me Out of Here!.

Broadcast
Australian Survivor was initially scheduled to air twice a week, with new episodes airing on Sunday and Monday at 7:30pm. However, following the first week, a third weekly episode — set to air Tuesdays at 7:30pm — was added to the schedule. The move was a means to both increase the exposure to the series to potential viewers and to increase the competitiveness of Ten's Tuesday schedule following low ratings for the previous programs airing in the 7:30pm slot, Modern Family and Life in Pieces.

In addition to the main show, a 9-part companion program, titled The Jury Villa, was released online through tenplay. Based on the similar Ponderosa series from the American show, the web series follows the last nine castaways to be voted off as they become members of the Tribal Council Jury and interact with one another and discuss the game in the villa. Episodes began airing after episode 17 and were uploaded following the airing of subsequent episodes.

Promotion
The primary sponsorships for the season include Hungry Jack's, AHM Health Insurance and Holden.

Contestants
The 24 castaways were initially divided into three tribes of eight, each named after a beach in Samoa: Aganoa, Saanapu and Vavau. On Day 12, two castaways each from Saanapu and Vavau swapped tribes as a result of a special joint Tribal Council in which the tribes unknowingly voted to switch a member of their tribe to the other; the switched castaways each brought a tribe member with them. After winning the reward challenge on Day 19, Saanapu earned the right to redistribute the 18 remaining castaways into two tribes of nine, and Aganoa was officially disbanded. For winning the immunity challenge on Day 29, Saanapu sent an observer to Vavau's Tribal Council where, instead of a vote, the observer was to "kidnap" one of the Vavau tribe members, bringing them back to Saanapu as an official member. 

On Day 32, the 13 remaining castaways merged into the Fia Fia tribe, named after the Samoan term for "celebration". The final 11 players comprised the two finalists and the nine members of the jury, who voted to decide which of the two finalists should be the "Sole Survivor" and be awarded the grand prize.

Future appearances 
Phoebe Timmons, Nick Iadanza, Brooke Jowett, Felicity "Flick" Egginton and Lee Carseldine competed on Australian Survivor: All Stars in 2020, while Sam Webb competed as a hero on Australian Survivor: Heroes V Villains in 2023.

Outside of Survivor, Brooke Jowett has competed on The Challenge: Australia in 2022. Matt Tarrant competed on the tenth season of Australia's Got Talent in 2022.

Season summary
The game began with three tribes of eight, and in each, a majority alliance was formed. On Saanapu, Flick and Brooke recruited Sam, Matt, and Conner. On Vavau, Craig, Andrew, Sue, and Jennah-Louise joined forces. And on Aganoa, Evan aligned with Phoebe, Rohan, Lee, and El, but drama from the idol clue twist between him and Rohan would see the alliance turn on Evan. On Day 12, a Fake Double Tribal Council consisting of Vavau and Saanapu occurred; Conner and Nick were voted out, but instead of leaving the game, were switched to the other tribe and they brought Sam and Tegan with them respectively. 

On Day 19, with 18 contestants remaining, a Reward Challenge won by Saanapu gave them the power to decide which tribe between Vavau and Saanapu to stay on. After the five remaining Saanapu remembers chose to stay at Saanapu, they then had the power to choose their remaining members. They selected Sam, El, and Lee for their challenge strength as well as Jennah-Louise with the intention of voting her off. The game became one-sided after the swap, as not only did the stronger Saanapu tribe dominate in challenges but Phoebe's idol plays ousted the two strongest members of Vavau in Rohan and Craig. After a fake Tribal Council spared Kristie, Phoebe's ally whom she threw under the bus to save herself, Brooke further decimated Vavau by adding Sue to her tribe. Phoebe would be voted out at the next Tribal, and the tribes would merge at 13.

The Saanapu alliance, with the original members of Flick, Brooke, Matt, and Sam at the core and with the help of members from post-swap Saanapu, would vote out the remnants of post-swap Vavau as well as outsiders from Saanapu up until the final 7. At that point, Flick viewed Brooke as too big of a threat and flipped to Lee, El, and Kristie to vote out her best friend. Despite El and Lee's obvious strong bond, Flick and Kristie did not flip back and voted out Sam and Matt. At that point Flick tried to force a 2-2 tiebreaker but Kristie still would not flip and Flick would go home. Despite not having won a previous individual challenge, Kristie won the Final Immunity Challenge and voted El out. At Final Tribal Council, despite Lee having more control of the game, Kristie's underdog status and the fruition of her floater strategy resulted in her receiving 8 of the 9 jury votes and becoming the "Sole Survivor". 

In the case of multiple tribes or castaways who win reward or immunity, they are listed in order of finish, or alphabetically where it was a team effort; where one castaway won and invited others, the invitees are in brackets.

Notes

Episodes

Voting history
Tribal phase (Day 1–31)

Individual phase (Day 32–55)

Notes

Reception

Ratings
Ratings data is from OzTAM and represents the viewership from the 5 largest Australian metropolitan centres (Sydney, Melbourne, Brisbane, Perth and Adelaide).

Notes

References

External links

2016 Australian television seasons
Australian Survivor seasons
Television shows filmed in Samoa